The Education of Charlie Banks is a 2007 American drama film directed by Fred Durst, produced by Straight Up Film's Marisa Polvino and starring Jesse Eisenberg, Jason Ritter, Eva Amurri, Gloria Votsis, and Chris Marquette. It had its world premiere at the 2007 Tribeca Film Festival, where it won the Made in NY Narrative Award. It is Durst's film directing debut. Peter Care was initially attached to direct. The Education of Charlie Banks received mixed reviews from critics who praised Ritter's performance but criticized Peter Elkoff's screenplay and Durst's direction.

Plot

As a kid, Charlie Banks both admired and feared the charismatic and violent local Mick Leary; in high school, Charlie witnesses Mick beat two jocks nearly to death at a party. Despite Mick being the buddy of his best friend, Danny, Charlie reports Mick to the police.

Three years later, Charlie and Danny are college freshmen. Mick, to their surprise, shows up for a visit. Though claiming to be visiting for the weekend, Mick moves into the two friends' dorm and begins borrowing their clothing, attending their classes, reading their books, and flirting with Mary, a woman on whom Charlie has a crush. Charlie begins to wonder if Mick has changed or if he is plotting fiendish revenge against him.

Cast
 Jesse Eisenberg as Charlie Banks
 Jason Ritter as Mick Leary
 Eva Amurri as Mary
 Gloria Votsis as Nia
 Chris Marquette as Danny Bowman
 Sebastian Stan as Leo Reilly
 Dennis Boutsikaris as Mr. Banks
 Charles Parnell as Assistant District Attorney Worsheck
 Josh Richman as Professor Gersten
 Steven Hinkle as Young Charlie Banks
 Miles Chandler as Young Mick Leary
 Cain Kerner as Young Danny
 Sam Daly as Owen

Release
The film premiered at the 2007 Tribeca Film Festival, where it won Best New York Narrative. It received a limited release in North America on March 27, 2009, before being released on DVD three months later on June 30, 2009.

Reception
The Education of Charlie Banks garnered mixed reviews from critics. The website's critical consensus reads: "Unevenness and earnestness mire this otherwise sweet, surprising coming of age drama." On Metacritic, the film has a weighted average score of 50 out of 100, based on 9 critics, indicating "mixed or average reviews".

Robert Abele of the Los Angeles Times wrote that: "Durst's direction is overly earnest, heavy in long takes, atmosphere wise but scene foolish." Joe Neumaier of the New York Daily News praised Eisenberg for giving a "nicely understated performance" as an "endearing everyman" but felt that Ritter lacked the "necessary air of danger" the script calls for in his role. Kyle Smith of the New York Post criticized the film's characters for being nothing but a "writer's creation" that deliver "flat and unconvincing" dialogue in an "improbable" story, but gave credit to Ritter for having "the charisma of a young Val Kilmer" and Durst for showing "a few stylistic touches that indicate he may have better films in him." Norman Wilner of NOW felt that Durst delivered "an overwhelmingly safe movie", criticizing Elkoff's script for having "simple dramatic constructions" and "measured steps" in its plot, and Eisenberg for giving a "blandly conceived version" of the characters he usually portrays, concluding that: "He does the required stammering and shrugging, but it's a tossed-off turn in a movie that’s similarly on autopilot."

Jeannette Catsoulis of The New York Times praised the film for Durst's detail-oriented direction in capturing the early '80s, and the "sincere performances (most notably from Mr. Ritter and Eva Amurri as Charlie's upper-crust crush) and clever writing" for keeping it from being "maudlin" and tell "a prickly examination of the sturdiness of class boundaries and the illusion of inclusion." Greg Quill of the Toronto Star pointed out that Elkoff's script carried elements of F. Scott Fitzgerald and his novel The Great Gatsby and had predictable revelations, but gave praise to the "sensitively and intelligently" written characters and Durst for being a storyteller with "great care and assurance" and an attention to detail on time period without being showy about it, calling it "an earnest, if romanticized, examination of the American class system in the late 1970s and early 1980s, and the eternally confounding politics of acceptance and exclusion." Despite being skeptic towards Durst's attempt to have viewers sympathize with the rebel Mick, Entertainment Weeklys Owen Gleiberman gave note of his "theatrical chops" and concluded that: "Ritter, who's like the young Ethan Hawke on a bender of violence, is an actor to watch." Michael Rechtshaffen of The Hollywood Reporter was critical of Elkoff's writing being "overtly literate" and Durst's direction for "underscoring the obvious", but commended him for being able to "establish[ing] the specifics of place and time" in the film's setting and craft an "impressively acted ensemble" with his young performers, highlighting Ritter's portrayal for having "a believably brooding intensity with a bad boy swagger" reminiscent of a young Matt Dillon.

References

External links
 
 
 
 

2007 films
2007 directorial debut films
2007 drama films
2007 independent films
2000s American films
2000s teen drama films
American coming-of-age drama films
American independent films
American teen drama films
2000s English-language films
Films directed by Fred Durst
Films scored by John Swihart
Films set in the 1970s
Films set in New York City
Films shot in New York City
Films shot in Rhode Island